Igor Cobileanski (born 24 February 1974) is a Moldovan film director born in Comrat (then USSR).

Filmography
 Când se stinge lumina (2005)
 Sasa, Grisa și Ion (2006)
 Plictis și inspiratie (2007)
 Tache (Movie) (2008)
 Colecția de arome (2013)
 The Unsaved (2013, director)
 Umbre (8 episodes, 2014–2015)
 Afacerea Est (2016)
 Practica (2017)
 Hackerville (2018)

See also 
 Moldova-Film

References

External links 
 

Romanian people of Moldovan descent
1974 births
People from Comrat
Moldovan film directors
Living people